Elections to South Cambridgeshire District Council took place on Thursday 3 May 2012, as part of the 2012 United Kingdom local elections. Nineteen seats, making up one third of South Cambridgeshire District Council, were up for election. Seats up for election in 2012 were last contested at the 2008 election. The Conservative Party retained their majority on the council.

Summary
At this election, Conservatives were defending 10 seats while Liberal Democrats and Independents were defending 4 seats each. Labour were defending their only seat on the council in Bassingbourn. Of the councillors elected in 2008, all were running for re-election except for incumbent Liberal Democrat Liz Heazell in Haslingfield and the Eversdens, and independent Mike Mason in Histon and Impington. The incumbent councillor in Longstanton, Alex Riley, was elected as an independent in 2008, but joined the Conservatives in 2011.

Only two seats changed hands at this election. In Haslingfield and the Eversdens, journalist Robin Page defeated the Liberal Democrat candidate by two votes, while in Linton the Conservatives defeated the incumbent Liberal Democrats by just one vote.

Results

Results by ward

References

2012
2012 English local elections
2010s in Cambridgeshire